Felix Moor (12 April 1903 Suure-Jaani – 15 May 1955 Tallinn) was Estonian actor and speech teacher. He was the first Estonian radio reporter.

1924 he finished Estonian Drama Studio Theatre school.

1925-1927 he was actor at Drama Studio Theatre. 1927-1944 he was Estonian Radio reporter.

After World War II he was related to the first live broadcasts at Estonia Radio.

References

1903 births
1955 deaths
Estonian radio personalities
Estonian educators
Estonian male stage actors
Estonian journalists
Burials at Metsakalmistu
People from Suure-Jaani